The First Doctor Adventures is a Big Finish Productions audio play series based on the British television programme Doctor Who. It sees David Bradley and Stephen Noonan as the First Doctor, a role originated by William Hartnell from 1963 to 1966, as well as by Bradley on television in the episodes "The Doctor Falls", "Twice Upon a Time", and "The Power of the Doctor".

History 

Beginning in 2017, it was announced that actor, David Bradley would portray the First Doctor, a role originated by William Hartnell from 1963 to 1966, as well as by Bradley on television in the episodes "The Doctor Falls" and "Twice Upon a Time". David Bradley also portrayed William Hartnell in the BBC bio-drama, An Adventure in Space and Time.

Also appearing are Claudia Grant as Susan Foreman, Jemma Powell as Barbara Wright and Jamie Glover as Ian Chesterton. These three actors also appeared alongside Bradley in the aforementioned BBC bio-drama. James Dreyfus joins the cast as an earlier incarnation of The Master prior to Roger Delgado.

Announced in September 2017, the first pair of stories was released on 25 December 2017, with a second pair released in July 2018. Confirmed in July 2018, a third duo was released in January 2019. The fourth and fifth volumes were announced in 2019 and 2021 respectively.

In May 2020, Big Finish announced that the Main Range would conclude with in March 2021, to be replaced with regular releases of each Doctor in their own boxsets throughout the year in 2022. A single boxset for the First Doctor was announced in May 2021, set for release in April 2022. Executive Producer, Nicholas Briggs in response to a fan letter stated in February 2022 issue of Vortex Magazine, "the new First Doctor range will feature an actor new to the role of the Doctor and he is, I assure you, amazing!". On 11 February 2022, Big Finish announced that Stephen Noonan will be portraying the First Doctor alongside Lauren Cornelius.

Cast

Episodes
Individual episodes have titles, reflecting the practice of the programme in the 1960s when William Hartnell played the First Doctor.

Adventures starring David Bradley
These stories are set somewhere after the Season 1 story The Reign of Terror and before the Season 2 story Planet of Giants.

Volume 1 (2017)

Volume 2 (2018)

Volume 3 (2019)

Volume 4 (2020)

Volume 5 (2021)

Adventures starring Stephen Noonan
These stories are set between the Season 3 stories The Savages and The War Machines.

Series 1: The Outlaws (2022)

Series 2: The Demon Song (2023)

Future 
In April 2022, Nicholas Briggs expressed interest in producing further stories with David Bradley. Stephen Noonan also expressed interest in returning for future boxsets. In Issue 167 of Big Finish's magazine Vortex, Briggs teased further stories featuring Bradley's portrayal, saying "We’ve some very exciting plans afoot for further stories with David Bradley — something quite out of the ordinary and rather delightful."

Awards and nominations

References

Audio plays based on Doctor Who
Big Finish Productions
Doctor Who spin-offs
Tenth Doctor audio plays